Estefanía Realpe (born June 13, 1990 in Quito, Ecuador) is a model and beauty pageant titleholder who was crowned Miss Earth Ecuador 2012 and was dethroned a fews days before to compete at Miss Earth 2012.

She was born in Quito, Realpe speaks Spanish and English.

Realpe was designed as Miss Earth Ecuador 2013 by the national director, José Hidalgo, on August 29, 2012, however, to enable her to compete in Miss Earth 2012, she was dethroned.

She is the first woman in competing at the three major beauty pageants in Ecuador: Miss Ecuador in 2012, Miss Earth Ecuador in 2012, and Miss World Ecuador in 2014.

References

External links
Official Miss Ecuador website

 dethroned

1990 births
Living people
Miss World Ecuador
Ecuadorian beauty pageant winners
Ecuadorian people of Spanish descent